(), a Dutch word that literally translates to "rice table", is an Indonesian elaborate meal adapted by the Dutch following the hidang presentation of nasi padang from the Padang region of West Sumatra. It consists of many (forty is not an unusual number) side dishes served in small portions, accompanied by rice prepared in several different ways. Popular side dishes include egg rolls, sambals, satay, fish, fruit, vegetables, pickles, and nuts. In most areas where it is served, such as the Netherlands, and other areas of strong Dutch influence (such as parts of the West Indies), it is known under its Dutch name.

Although the dishes served are undoubtedly Indonesian, the rijsttafel’s origins were colonial. The Dutch introduced the rice table not only so they could enjoy a wide array of dishes at a single sitting but also to impress visitors with the exotic abundance of their colony.

Rijsttafels strive to feature an array of not only flavors and colors and degrees of spiciness but also textures, an aspect that is not commonly discussed in Western food. Such textures may include crispy, chewy, slippery, soft, hard, velvety, gelatinous, and runny.

History
The rijsttafel was created to provide a festive and official type of banquet that would represent the multi-ethnic nature of the Indonesian archipelago. Dishes were assembled from many of the far flung regions of Indonesia, where many different cuisines exist, often determined by ethnicity and culture of the particular island or island group — from Javanese favourite sateh, tempeh and seroendeng, to vegetarian cuisine gado-gado and lodeh with sambal lalab from Batavia and Preanger. From spicy rendang and gulai curry from the Minangkabau region in Sumatra, to East Indies ubiquitous dishes nasi goreng, soto ayam, and kroepoek crackers. Also Indonesian dishes from hybrid influences; such as Chinese babi ketjap, loempia, and bami to European beef smoor. And there are many others from the hundreds of inhabited islands, which contain more than 300 regional and ethnic language groups.

During its centuries of popularity in Dutch East Indies, lines of servants or sarong-clad waitresses ceremoniously served the marathon meal on platters laden with steaming bowls of fragrant foods. The first to be served was a cone-shaped pile of rice on a large platter, which the server placed in the center of the table. The servers then surrounded the rice platter with as many as 40 small bowls holding meat and vegetable dishes as well as condiments. During its colonial heyday until Japanese occupation of Dutch East Indies in 1942, the most celebrated rijsttafel in the Indies was served for Sunday luncheon at the Hotel des Indes in Batavia and the Savoy Homann Hotel in Bandung, where the rice was accompanied by sixty different dishes.

Brought back to the Netherlands by former colonials and exiled Indonesians and Indo-Europeans (Eurasians) after Indonesia gained its independence in 1945, the rijsttafel was predominantly popular with Dutch families with colonial roots. On the other hand, when Indonesia proclaimed its independence in 1945, nationalist sentiment promoted the rejection of Dutch colonial culture and customs, including the flamboyant rice table. Today, the rice table has practically disappeared from Indonesia's restaurants and is served only by a handful of fine-dining restaurants in Indonesia. A typical rijsttafel will have several dining tables covered with different dishes; while in some fancy settings in Indonesia, each dish may be served by a separate waitress. 

Since about 1990, Indonesian food has become part of a mainstream interest in South East Asian cuisine, and there has been a proliferation of Indonesian restaurants in the Netherlands.

Typical dishes
The following is a brief, but not nearly complete, list of examples of foods that may be found on a rijsttafel:
 Acar – pickled vegetables
 Babi kecap – pork belly braised in sweet soy sauce common in the Netherlands; a halal Indonesian version often uses beef variant known as semur
 Babi panggang – roasted pork in a tomato based sauce 
 Bebek betutu – duck roasted in banana leaves
 Bebek Peking – Chinese-style roasted duck
 Capcay – stir-fried vegetables
 Empal gentong – curry-like beef soup
 Gado-gado – vegetables (cooked or fresh) with peanut sauce (sambal kacang)
 Gudeg – young jackfruit with palm sugar and coconut milk
 Karedok – vegetable salad in peanut sauce
 Krupuk – chips
 Lemper – rice rolls with spicy filling
 Lumpia – spring rolls
 Nasi goreng – fried rice
 Nasi kuning – Indonesian yellow rice
 Nasi uduk – steamed rice in coconut milk
 Opor ayam – chicken coconut curry
 Pecel – vegetable salad in peanut sauce
 Perkedel – meat and potato patties
 Pisang goreng – banana fritters
 Rawon – blackish beef soup
 Rendang – aromatic spicy caramelized beef, braised in coconut milk, chillies, and spices 
 Sambal iris – onion, tomato, and chilli paste
 Sambal kacang – peanut sauce
 Sambal ulek – spicy chilli paste
 Satay (sometimes spelled saté, sate, or sateh) – various thinly sliced meats, marinated then broiled on a skewer, such as: sate ayam (chicken); sate babi (pork); sate lilit (seafood)
 Sayur lodeh – vegetable stew (spicy) in coconut milk
 Semur daging  – a type of stew of beef braised in sweet soy sauce
 Serundeng – peanuts with sautéed shredded coconut
 Tahu telur – tofu omelette
 Telur balado – hard-boiled eggs sautéed in chilli sauce
 Telur bumbu bali – hard-boiled eggs sautéed in Balinese spice mixture

Today

Despite its popularity in the Netherlands and abroad, the rijsttafel is rarely found in Indonesia. That is probably because most Indonesian meals consist of rice accompanied by only one, two or three dishes, mostly consisting of lauk (fish, chicken, meat, egg, or other source of protein), sayur (vegetable), and other side dishes. To consume more than that number of dishes at once (a rijsttafel might range from seven to forty dishes) is considered too extravagant and too expensive. The closest versions to rice table dishes readily available in Indonesia are local nasi Padang and nasi campur. However, in Indonesian restaurants around the world, especially in Belgium, the Netherlands, and South Africa, the rijsttafel is still popular.

Today only a handful of dining establishments in Indonesia ceremoniously serve elaborate colonial-style rijsttafel. Rijsttafel is commonly found only in select upscale Indonesian restaurants, mainly the ones in Jakarta. In July 2011, the airline Garuda Indonesia launched Indonesian rijsttafel in Executive Class as its signature in-flight service. This Indonesian signature dining was meant to introduce the passenger to a wide array of Indonesian cuisine in a single setting as part of Garuda Indonesia experience. This in-flight Indonesian rijsttafel includes Indonesian signature dishes; choices of nasi kuning or regular steamed rice, accompanied with choices of dishes such as satay, rendang, gado-gado grilled chicken rica, red snapper in yellow acar sauce, fried shrimp in sambal, potato perkedel and tempeh, also with kerupuk or rempeyek crackers.

See also

 List of rice dishes

References

Further reading
 Hulupi, Maria Endah. "Rijstafel: finding enough room for all those dishes" (Archive). The Jakarta Post. October 29, 2003.

Dutch fusion cuisine
Dutch words and phrases
Indonesian fusion cuisine
Indonesian rice dishes
Meals